From a Second Story Window (sometimes abbreviated as FASSW) was a metalcore band that formed in 1999 in Ohio, United States, as Aphasia. By 2003, they had changed their name to From a Second Story Window.

History
The band's first EP was self-released as The Cassandra Complex in 2003. It was repackaged and re-released by Black Market Activities as Not One Word Has Been Omitted in 2004. In 2006, the band released Delenda, their first full-length album under Black Market Activities and distributed by Metal Blade.

After releasing Delenda, the band toured throughout North America and Europe until the summer of 2007. Then they finished writing their second full-length album. Conversations was released May 27, 2008, again on Black Market Activities. They toured Europe in 2007, along with Walls of Jericho, Born from Pain, Fear My Thoughts, All Shall Perish, and Freya. On August 29, 2008, in a MySpace blog, the band announced that they had disbanded.

Musical style
The band's first two releases primarily featured a mix of progressive metal, mathcore, and deathcore, with AllMusic reviewer Stewart Mason referring to Delenda as "deeply schizoid." Conversations features a more melodic progressive metalcore and post-hardcore sound, dropping most of the mathcore and deathcore influences from previous releases.

Members

Final line-up 
Will Jackson – vocals (2005-2008)
Joe "Dad" Sudrovic – bass guitar (1999–2008)
Nick "Puffman" Huffman – drums (2003–2008)
Paul "Fat Paul" Misko – guitar (2006–2008) 
Rob Hileman – guitar (1999–2008)

Previous members 
Jeff "Jpetes" Peterson – vocals (1999-2003)
Sean "Skeens" Vandegrift – vocals (2003–2005)
Derek Macaroni – guitar (1999–2006)

Discography
Studio albums

Extended plays

Compilations

Music videos

References

External links 
Official website
Official MySpace
tour info on MTV.com

Metalcore musical groups from Ohio
American deathcore musical groups
American post-hardcore musical groups
Musical groups established in 2003
Musical groups disestablished in 2008
Black Market Activities artists
Musical quintets
2003 establishments in the United States